Camillo Camilli (c. 1704 – 1754) was a notable master luthier of the 18th century. 

The instruments of Camilli, most of which he made in Mantua, in northern Italy, are prized by string musicians to this day. He was a pupil of Zanotti, but was mainly influenced by Pietro Guarneri of Mantua, called the grandfather of Mantuan violin making. Guarneri's influence can be seen on the work of Camilli, particularly in the shape of the instrument, the purfling, and the way the notches of the f-hole are cut.

References

1700s births
1754 deaths
Italian luthiers
Businesspeople from Mantua